Judith Lynne Sill (October 7, 1944 – November 23, 1979) was an American singer and songwriter. The first artist signed to David Geffen's Asylum label, she released two albums on Asylum and partially completed a third album before dying of a drug overdose in 1979.
Her eponymous debut album was released in late 1971 and was followed about 18 months later by Heart Food. In 1974, she recorded demos for a third album, which never was completed. The demos were released posthumously with other rarities on the 2005 two-disc collection Dreams Come True.

Sill was influenced by Bach, while lyrically her work drew substantially on Christian themes of rapture and redemption.

Biography

Early life 
Judith Lynne Sill was born in Studio City, Los Angeles, California, on October 7, 1944, and spent her early childhood in the Oakland, California area. Her father, Milford "Bun" Sill, an importer of exotic animals for use in films, owned a bar in Oakland, in which Sill learned to play the piano. When Milford Sill died of pneumonia in 1952, Sill's mother Oneta moved with Judee and her older brother Dennis to Los Angeles, where Oneta soon met and married Tom and Jerry animator Kenneth Muse.

In a 1972 Rolling Stone magazine interview, Sill described her home life after her mother's remarriage as unhappy and frequently violent due to physical fights between Sill and her parents. She transferred from a public high school (Birmingham High School in Van Nuys) to a private school, where she met other rebellious teenagers, some of whom were allegedly involved in crime. Either during high school or after her graduation (depending on the source), Sill and a man she had met committed a series of armed robberies of businesses such as liquor stores and gas stations. Sill and her robbery partner were soon arrested and she spent nine months in reform school, where she served as church organist and "learned a lot of good music" including gospel music.

After being released, Sill briefly attended San Fernando Valley Junior College as an art major. She also played piano in the school orchestra and worked in a piano bar. In 1964, her mother died, and she left college and moved out of her stepfather's home. She started doing LSD and other drugs, moved in with an LSD dealer and joined a jazz trio.

In April 1966, Sill married pianist Robert Maurice "Bob" Harris.
The couple lived in Las Vegas for a time, but both developed crippling heroin addictions within months. When Sill moved back to California, she resorted to sex work, scams, and check forgery to support her habit. A string of narcotics and forgery offenses sent her to jail, and she learned that her brother Dennis had suddenly died of a liver infection. When she got out, she immediately set to work as a song composer.

Music career 
Sill encountered Graham Nash and David Crosby and toured with them for a time as their opening act. After some initial interest from Atlantic Records, David Geffen offered her a contract with his new Asylum label. She sold her song "Lady-O" to the Turtles, and was featured on the cover of Rolling Stone. Harris worked on her first album and was involved with the Turtles (which led to his short stint as keyboardist with Frank Zappa's Mothers of Invention in 1971).

Graham Nash produced her first album's first single, "Jesus Was a Cross Maker", released to radio on October 1, 1971. The album Judee Sill was released on September 15, 1971. It featured Sill's voice in multiple overdubs, often in a four-part chorale or fugue. She worked with engineer Henry Lewy, noted for his work with Joni Mitchell throughout the 1970s. The album was not a commercial success.

In January and February 1973, she was the support act on a tour of the UK by Roy Harper.

Sill took over the orchestration and arrangements on her second album Heart Food, which included "The Donor". Heart Food was released in March 1973 and was critically acclaimed, but sold poorly, leading to the end of her association with Geffen and Asylum Records. Sill's friends have said that she lacked the resilience to cope with poor album sales and bad reviews of her work, and that she was dropped after she refused to perform as an opening act, a task she disliked. According to another source, Geffen pulled support for Heart Food and refused to release any more of her records after Sill, frustrated over what she perceived as his lack of support for her career, publicly referred to him by using a homophobic slur (she either called Geffen "fat fag" on stage or referred to his "faggoty pink shoes").

She continued to write songs, and in 1974, began to record new material for a planned third album at the studio of Michael Nesmith. By this time, Sill was once again suffering from drug abuse and other health problems, and her music was not regarded as marketable. She also was beginning to lose interest in music and focus on other pursuits, including theosophy and animals. In the mid-1970s, she worked for a time as a cartoonist with a Los Angeles animation studio. Her 1974 recordings were never finished. Twenty-six years after Sill's 1979 death, the unfinished songs were mixed by Jim O'Rourke and released, along with a collection of rarities and home demos, as the album Dreams Come True on the Water label.

Personal life and death 
Sill's personal life was turbulent, and she was affected by the early deaths of her father, mother and brother. Sill claimed to have been married twice, saying in interviews that she was briefly married either during or just after high school to a classmate, that her parents had the marriage annulled, and that he later died in a rafting accident. A friend of Sill's has written that she claimed to have married her robbery partner as a teenager. Sill's second marriage was to Robert Maurice "Bob" Harris on April 27, 1966, in Clark County, Nevada. They divorced in 1972. She married Samir Ben Taieb Kamoun, a Tunisian actor, mime, and Charlie Chaplin impersonator, on January 24, 1979, in Clark County, Nevada.

Sill was openly bisexual. Her romance with singer-songwriter J. D. Souther inspired her song "Jesus Was a Cross Maker". Souther later wrote the song "Something in the Dark" about her. She had a long-term relationship with poet David Omer Bearden, who contributed lyrics to Heart Food and toured and performed with her; Sill dedicated Heart Food to him. As Asylum's first published artist, Sill also had a close friendship with David Geffen, which went awry after comments she made in frustration at not receiving enough promotion for her second UK tour.

After a series of car accidents and failed surgery for a painful back injury, Sill struggled with drug addiction and dropped out of the music scene. She died of a drug overdose, or "acute cocaine and codeine intoxication," on November 23, 1979, at her apartment on Morrison Street in North Hollywood. The Los Angeles coroner ruled her death a suicide, taking into account a note found near her body, but some who knew her have contended that the note, which reportedly contained "a meditation on rapture, the hereafter, and the innate mystery of life", was not a suicide note but rather a diary entry or song concept. Her ashes were scattered into the Pacific Ocean after a ceremony organized by a few close friends at the Self-Realization Fellowship in Pacific Palisades, Los Angeles. According to a 2006 Washington Post story, by the time of Sill's death, she had become so obscure that no obituary was published, and for many years, a number of her friends were unaware she had died.

Influence and legacy 
Although Sill's music was not commercially successful, a number of later songwriters have been fans of her work, including Andy Partridge, Liz Phair, Warren Zevon, Shawn Colvin, Steven Wilson, Robin Pecknold, Daniel Rossen, Bill Callahan and Terra Spencer. She was included in The Billboard Guide to Contemporary Christian Music; her faith was debatable, but she made frequent use of Christian symbolism in her lyrics, combined with a "lack of sensuality" and the "denial of the physical". Her music has been described as "intensely devotional".

Nick Lowe has said that "Jesus Was a Crossmaker" was an influence on his Brinsley Schwarz song "(What's So Funny 'Bout) Peace, Love, and Understanding".

A BBC Radio 4 programme titled The Lost Genius of Judee Sill was broadcast on September 9, 2014.

The Okkervil River song "Okkervil River R.I.P." speaks of Sill as having died "in some trailer park of cocaine and codeine, all alone."

Singer-songwriter Laura Veirs' "Song for Judee" on the 2016 album case/lang/veirs is about Sill's life and death. In an interview with CBC music, Veirs said of the track "We weren't sure we were going to track this one because not everyone in the band loved it. We recorded it on a whim and all fell in love with it. It's about a tragic songwriter from the '70s named Judee Sill. I love how the bouncy chorus offsets the darkness of her story."

Singer-songwriter Aaron Lee Tasjan's "Judee Was a Punk" on the 2015 album In The Blazes is about Sill.

Posthumous reissues and releases 
Terry Hounsome's 1981 book New Rock Record lists a Sill album titled Tulips From Amsterdam. Unsure of the information's source, Hounsome later removed the listing from his database.

Sill appears on Tommy Peltier's Chariot of Astral Light (featuring Judee Sill), which was recorded in the 1970s but not released until 2005 on the Black Beauty label. She contributed guitar, organ and backing vocals to six tracks on the album and is pictured with Peltier on the cover. Also in 2005, Sill's unfinished recordings, mixed by Jim O'Rourke, were released along with other rarities and unreleased demos as Dreams Come True, a two-CD set on Water Records. Sill's two original albums, Judee Sill and Heart Food, were released that year as individual CDs, each with bonus tracks, on the Rhino Handmade label. The next year, Rhino released Abracadabra: The Asylum Years, a two-CD set of both albums with bonus tracks.

In 2007, an album of Sill's live performance tracks performed for the BBC was released as Live in London: The BBC Recordings 1972–1973.

In 2017 independent record label Intervention Records released 180-gram double 45rpm LP reissues of Sill's self-titled album and Heart Food.

Covers 
"Jesus Was a Cross Maker" has been covered by the Hollies on their 1972 album Romany; by Cass Elliot on her self-titled 1972 album; by Judie Tzuke on her 1991 album Left Hand Talking; by Warren Zevon on his 1995 album Mutineer; and Frida Hyvönen in 2009. A 2005 cover by Rachael Yamagata was featured in the soundtrack of the Cameron Crowe film Elizabethtown, in which The Hollies' version is played over the opening credits. The soundtrack album for the film contains versions by both Yamagata and the Hollies.

Shawn Colvin performed "There's a Rugged Road" on her 1994 collection of covers titled Cover Girl.

Jane Siberry contributed vocals to a cover of "The Kiss" for Ghostland's album Interview with the Angel. This version was also released on Siberry's 2001 compilation City. "The Kiss" was also covered by Bonnie "Prince" Billy on his 2004 CD single No More Workhorse Blues; by Neil Cavanagh on his 2008 album Short Flight to a Distant Star; and by Matt Alber, using Sill's original piano arrangement, on his 2011 album Constant Crows.

In 2009, the independent label American Dust announced the release of Crayon Angel: A Tribute to the Music of Judee Sill, featuring covers of Sill's songs done by Beth Orton, Bill Callahan, Ron Sexsmith, Daniel Rossen, Final Fantasy, Marissa Nadler, Frida Hyvönen and Meg Baird, among others.

Actress Greta Gerwig covered "There's a Rugged Road" in the 2010 Noah Baumbach film, Greenberg.

In November 2016, in conjunction with Record Store Day, the Fruit Bats released The Glory of the Fruit Bats, a limited edition LP comprising previously unreleased originals, select covers, and cinematic instrumentals, including a cover of "My Man on Love" from Sill's 1971 debut album.

Discography 

Studio albums
 Judee Sill (1971)
 Heart Food (1973)

Compilation albums
 Dreams Come True (2005)
 Abracadabra: The Asylum Years (2006)
 Live in London: The BBC Recordings 1972–1973 (2007)
 Songs of Rapture and Redemption: Rarities & Live (2018)

References

External links 

Judee Sill Biography
Observer article
Washington Post article by Tim Page
UNCUT article on Sill
Unreleased recordings
"Judee Sill's Posthumous 'Dreams'"
Judee's Epitaph

1944 births
1979 deaths
American acoustic guitarists
American folk guitarists
American women singer-songwriters
American pianists
American women pianists
Bisexual singers
Bisexual songwriters
Bisexual women
Cocaine-related deaths in California
Drug-related deaths in California
LGBT people from California
American LGBT singers
American LGBT songwriters
Musicians from Oakland, California
Singer-songwriters from California
People from Studio City, Los Angeles
Guitarists from California
20th-century American women singers
20th-century American pianists
Birmingham High School alumni
20th-century American women guitarists
20th-century American LGBT people